Cimadolmo is a comune   in the province of Treviso, Veneto, northern Italy.

References

Cities and towns in Veneto